Liptovské Revúce is a large village and municipality in Ružomberok District in the Žilina Region of northern Slovakia.

History
In historical records the village was first mentioned in 1233.

Geography
The municipality lies at an altitude of 680 metres and covers an area of 76.914 km². It has a population of about 1690 people.

External links
http://revuce.sk/en/

Villages and municipalities in Ružomberok District